{{DISPLAYTITLE:5-HT1E receptor}}

5-hydroxytryptamine (serotonin) 1E receptor (5-HT1E) is a highly expressed human G-protein coupled receptor that belongs to the 5-HT1 receptor family (Gi-coupled serotonin receptor). The human gene is denoted as HTR1E.

Function 

The function of the 5-HT1E receptor is unknown due to the lack of selective pharmacological tools, specific antibodies, and permissive animal models. The 5-HT1E receptor gene lacks polymorphisms amongst humans (few mutations), indicating a high degree of evolutionary conservation of genetic sequence, which suggests that the 5-HT1E receptor has an important physiological role in humans. It is hypothesized that the 5-HT1E receptor is involved in the regulation of memory in humans due to the high abundance of receptors in the frontal cortex, hippocampus, and olfactory bulb, all of which are regions of the brain integral to memory regulation.

This receptor is unique among the serotonin receptors in that it is not known to be expressed by rats or mouse species, all of which lack the gene encoding the 5-HT1E receptor. However the genomes of the pig, rhesus monkey, and several lagomorphs (including rabbit) as well as the guinea pig each encode a homologous 5-HT1E receptor gene. The guinea pig is the most likely candidate for future study of 5-HT1E receptor function in vivo. The expression of 5-HT1E receptors in the guinea pig brain has been pharmacologically confirmed; 5-HT1E receptor expression patterns of the human and guinea pig brains appear to be similar. 
In the human cortex, the expression of 5-HT1E undergoes a marked transition during adolescence, in a way that is strongly correlated with the expression of 5-HT1B.

The most closely related receptor to the 5-HT1E is the 5-HT1F receptor. They share 57% amino acid sequence homology and have some pharmacological characteristics in common. Both receptors are Gi-coupled (inhibit adenylate cyclase activity) and both receptors have high affinities for 5-HT and low affinities for 5-carboxyamidotryptaine and mesulergine. However, due to major differences in brain expression patterns, these receptors are unlikely to mediate similar functions in humans. For example, 5-HT1E receptors  are abundant in the hippocampus but are not detectable in the striatum (caudate and putamen of the human brain), while the opposite is true for the 5-HT1F receptor. Thus, conclusions about the function of the 5-HT1E receptor cannot be ascribed to the function of the 5-HT1F receptor, and vice versa.

Selective ligands 

No highly selective 5-HT1E ligands are available yet. [3H]5-HT remains the only radioligand available with high affinity for the 5-HT1E receptor (5nM).

Agonists 

 BRL-54443 (5-Hydroxy-3-(1-methylpiperidin-4-yl)-1H-indole) - mixed 5-HT1E/1F agonist

Antagonists 
None as yet.

See also 
 5-HT1 receptor
 5-HT receptor

References

External links

Further reading 

 
 
 
 
 

Serotonin receptors
Neuroscience of memory